Jasper E. "Jep" Bisbee  (29 July 1843 – 10 August 1935) was an American old-time musician.  Bisbee was one of the few oldtime musicians, who recorded for Edison Records recordings and one of the first rural musicians who ever produced a record.

Childhood
Jasper Bisbee was born in 1843 in Ossian, New York as the youngest son of Alanson and Mary C. (Bagley) Bisbee. In 1858 the family moved to Ionia County, Michigan, where they lived on a farm where the young Bisbee helped. During this time he also developed his interest in music.

Later life and career
During the American Civil War, Bisbee moved around with a show in which he played the drum.  After the war, from 1869 to 1918, Bisbee often changed his profession - music in his life but always present, thus earning himself something he probably took from time to time even the biggest part of his income.
Only after 80 years of career as a recording artist began Bisbees. On 28 November 1923 Thomas Edison, founder of Edison Records, invited Bisbee, his son, Earl and his daughter Beulah into the Edison studio, where on the first day with Earl (bass) and Beulah (piano) recorded a few songs, but were not published. On the second day Bisbee was accompanied only by his daughter. Together they played Opera Reel, The Devil's Dream, Money Musk with Variations, The Girl I Left Behind Me, McDonald's Reel and College Hornpipe. Bisbee required for each piece three takes, so alone on the second day were 18 bands together. For a man of his age was certainly a remarkable achievement - Thomas Edison later said that Bisbee made the most shots in one day for Edison, although this is doubtful.
In February 1924, Edison published The Devil's Dream, which sold very well. The Opera Reel also showed good sales figures, so the other pieces were published. Still, it was Bisbees single session, which is probably due to his advanced age at that time. His last appearance was in 1935 shortly before his death at a church festival, shortly after the appearance Bisbee suffered one heart attack and a brain hemorrhage. He was taken to the local hospital, where he died from the effects at the age of 92 years. Bisbee is buried in Michigan.

References

1843 births
1935 deaths
American fiddlers
Old-time musicians
Musicians from New York (state)
People from Livingston County, New York
People from Ionia County, Michigan